Valmacca is a comune (municipality) in the Province of Alessandria in the Italian region Piedmont, located about  east of Turin and about  north of Alessandria in an area of plain on the right of the Po River at the confluence of the Rotaldo and the Gattola.

Valmacca borders the following municipalities: Bozzole, Breme, Frassineto Po, Pomaro Monferrato, Sartirana Lomellina, and Ticineto.

References

Cities and towns in Piedmont